The United Nations established six principal organs of the Organization: the General Assembly, the United Nations Security Council, the Economic and Social Council, the United Nations Trusteeship Council (this Council suspended operations in (1994), the International Court of Justice, and the Secretariat. The Charter allowed for the creation of any other entities that were seen as required. Since its creation, the United Nations is now considerably larger, encompassing numerous specialised organisations and agencies, programmes and funds, training and research bodies as well as other service providers. There are also numerous subsidiary bodies, including committees, commissions, boards, councils, panels, and working groups some of which this list includes.

This list is a work in progress and should be cross checked with other sources. (A more comprehensive list is available at the United Nations System article.)UN specialized agencies are:-
•FAO - Food and Agricultural Organization.
•ICAO - International Civil Aviation Organization.
•IFAD - International Fund for Agricultural Development.
•ILO - International Labour Organization.
•IMF - International Monetary Fund.
•IMO - International Maritime Organization.

Specialised Organizations and agencies 
The United Nations maintains and supports a number of specialized organizations and agencies. These differ from the programmes and funds in that they are headed by an executive board of member states, separate from the General Assembly. Sometimes they do not report to the General Assembly or Security Council but only to their own member states. Some of these bodies also predate the United Nations as is the case for the ITU formed in 1865 to administer an international treaty and the ILO created as part of the League of Nations.

Departments and offices of the United Nations Secretariat 
The United Nations Secretariat carries out the day-to-day work of the Organisation. It services the other principal organs of the United Nations and administers the programmes and policies laid down by them. At its head is the Secretary-General, who is appointed by the General Assembly. The Secretariat administers a number of notable Offices and Departments.

Treaty organisations 
The United Nations maintains, administers or has a working relationship with a number of organisations dedicated to the administration of a variety of international treaties and conventions. At times these perform specific administrative functions while also providing a specific forum for discussing issues around a particular treaty. The organisations themselves generally report to the member states of the treaty rather than to the General Assembly.

Research and training institutes 
There are only five officially recognised training bodies of the United Nations System. Irrespective of what does or does not constitute a United Nations organization, many other institutions serve a research or training purpose, and some are part of other organisations and funds. These are also contained below.

Subsidiary bodies of the General Assembly 
The following entities were established by the General Assembly.

See also 
 United Nations System

References

